Giuseppe Petrocchi (born 19 August 1948) is an Italian Roman Catholic prelate who has served as the Archbishop of L'Aquila since 2013. Pope Francis made him a cardinal on 28 June 2018.

Life
Giuseppe Petrocchi was born on 19 August 1948 in Ascoli Piceno.

Petrocchi commenced his ecclesial studies in his home diocese on 4 October 1965 where he finished his high school education before being sent to the Pontifico Seminario Romano Maggiore in September 1967. He completed his studies at the Lateran where he obtained a bachelor's degree before pursuing further studies at Sapienza University of Rome and at the University of Macerata.

He was ordained to the priesthood on 14 September 1973 in the church of San Pietro Martire  and began work as a teacher and pastor. Pope John Paul II appointed him Bishop of Latina-Terracina-Sezze-Priverno on 27 June 1998 and he received episcopal consecration the following 20 September in Ascoli Piceno from Bishop Silvano Montevecchi, the co-consecrators being Bishops Domenico Pecile and Marcello Morgante. He took possession of his diocese on 18 October.

He was appointed Archbishop of L'Aquila on 8 June 2013, took possession the following month, and received the pallium from the Pope on 29 June 2013 in Saint Peter's Basilica. On 28 June 2018 Pope Francis made Archbishop Petrocchi a cardinal, assigning him the titular church of San Giovanni Battista dei Fiorentini.

On 22 September 2018 Cardinal Petrocchi was appointed a member of the Pontifical Commission for Vatican City State, of the Congregation for Catholic Education on 6 October 2018, and of the Congregation for the Causes of Saints on 27 April 2019. In April 2020 he was appointed to head a second commission that was to study the question of the ordination of women to the diaconate.

See also
 Cardinals created by Francis

References

External links
 
 Diocese of L'Aquila 

1948 births
20th-century Italian cardinals
20th-century Italian Roman Catholic archbishops
Bishops appointed by Pope John Paul II
Bishops in Lazio
Bishops of L'Aquila
Cardinals created by Pope Francis
Living people
People from Ascoli Piceno
Pontifical Lateran University alumni
Sapienza University of Rome alumni